Elina Hannele Syrjälä (born 1 March 1982) is a Finnish former football defender who finished her playing career at HJK Helsinki of the Naisten Liiga. She previously played for FC Honka, with whom she also played in the European Cup, and Asker Fotball in Norway's Toppserien. She was also a member of the Finnish national team, appearing in the 2011 World Cup qualifying and the 2011 Algarve Cup. She announced her retirement from football in April 2012.

References

1982 births
Living people
Finnish women's footballers
Finnish expatriate footballers
Finnish expatriate sportspeople in Norway
Expatriate women's footballers in Norway
Toppserien players
Finland women's international footballers
Kansallinen Liiga players
Helsingin Jalkapalloklubi (women) players
FC Honka (women) players
Women's association football defenders
Footballers from Helsinki